Mary King's Close is a historic close located under buildings on the Royal Mile, in the historic Old Town area of Edinburgh, Scotland. It took its name from one Mary King, a merchant burgess who resided on the Close in the 17th century. The close was partially demolished and buried due to the building of the Royal Exchange in the 18th century, and later closed to the public for many years. The area became shrouded in myths and urban legends; tales of hauntings and murders abounded.

The close is currently operated as a tourist attraction by Continuum Attractions.

Hauntings 
Mary King's Close has had a reputation for hauntings since at least the 17th century, with several paranormal investigations taking place. It has been pointed out that this particular Close ran the nearest of any to the old Nor Loch, a stagnant and highly polluted marsh; biogas escaping into the close and creating eerie lights may have been the cause for these rumours of spirit hauntings. It is also said that the gas escaping into the closes was known to cause hallucinations.

 Mary King's Close was featured on Series 4 of Most Haunted.
Featured in Haunted History's episode "Haunted Edinburgh" 
 Mary King's Close is the subject of episode 18 of the "How Haunted?" podcast.
 A 2004 television adaptation of Ian Rankin's Inspector Rebus novel Mortal Causes, the fourth episode in the first series of Rebus, featured a murder whose victim was found in Mary King's Close.
 Mary King's Close appears on the Most Haunted Live Halloween 2006 show.
 Annie's room and Mary King's Close both appear in Episode 6 of Billy Connolly's World Tour of Scotland.
 Mary King's Close appears on the History Channel's 2007 program Cities of the Underworld Episode "Scotland's Sin City".
 Mary King's Close was also featured on the Discovery Channel India show Discovery's Biggest Shows (aired at 8:00 pm Indian Standard Time on Sunday, 7 October 2007)
 Mary King's Close was also featured in an episode of Ghost Hunters International which first aired in the U.S. on 9 January 2008 on the Sci Fi Channel and in the UK on 1 June 2008 on Living2.
 Mary King's Close was featured on the Discovery Kids original series Mystery Hunters on the episode "King's Close and Winchester House".
 Mary King's Close was featured on an episode of Lost World "Jekyl and Hyde" History International (2007).
 Mary King's Close was used to test the low light capabilities of two digital compact system cameras in The Gadget Show (Season 17 Episode 9) aired in the UK on 7 January 2013 on Channel 5 (UK).

References in literature 
Mary King's Close was the subject of a vigil conducted by a team of ghost hunters on 13-14 October 2012. The vigil was documented in Chapter 3 ("Don't lick the Wallpaper!" - a reference to the original, arsenic-laced wallpaper found in the Close's dwellings) of the book Ghosts of Edinburgh by Newcastle-born author Rob Kirkup. Mary King's Close is the setting for the teen fiction novel Crow Boy written by Philip Caveney and published by Scottish-based publisher Fledgling Press in November 2012.
Mary King's Close is a location in Teen Fiction Novel City of Ghosts by V.E. Schwab published by Scholastic on September 6, 2018. It is a location in Mortal Causes by Ian Rankin where a body is found.

See also
 Royal Mile
 Black Death
 Plague doctor

References

External links
 
 

Streets in Edinburgh
Tourist attractions in Edinburgh
Royal Mile
Reportedly haunted locations in Scotland
Reportedly haunted locations in Edinburgh